Coptera is a genus of wasps belonging to the family Diapriidae.

The genus has almost cosmopolitan distribution.

Species

Species:

Coptera acantha 
Coptera alticeps 
Coptera angulata

References

Diapriidae
Hymenoptera genera